Michael Charles Phillips (March 24, 1956 – April 25, 2015) was an American professional basketball player. He played professionally for eleven years in Spain, including six years in Spain's top-tier level league, the Liga ACB.

High school
Phillips attended and played basketball at Manchester High School, in New Franklin, Ohio, from 1970 to 1974.  He helped lead Manchester to the Ohio state AA basketball title in 1974 with a 26-0 record. His 2,573 career points rank 7th most in Ohio high school history.

College career
Phillips played college basketball for the Kentucky Wildcats, for coach Joe B. Hall. He helped Kentucky win a national championship in 1978. He teamed with  Rick Robey, to form a duo known as the Twin Towers.

Phillips played four years for the Wildcats, earning All-SEC honors in his sophomore (second team), junior (second team) and senior years (third team).  In his senior season, Phillips averaged more than 10 points per game on the Wildcats' 1978 national championship team.  For his career, Phillips finished 25th on the school's career scoring list, with 1,367 points (11.4 per game), and he also grabbed 755 rebounds (6.3 per game).

Professional career
Following graduation, Phillips was drafted by the New Jersey Nets, in the 1978 NBA Draft, but he never played in the NBA.  In 1979, he found his way to Spain, where he had a fruitful career.  Phillips played six years in Spain's top-tier level league, the Liga ACB, and he won an ACB league championship in 1981, with FC Barcelona.  For his ACB career, Phillips scored 4,423 points (23.2 per game) and grabbed 1,765 rebounds (9.2 per game) in his six seasons.

Death
Phillips died after falling down a flight of stairs at his Madisonville, Kentucky, home, on April 25, 2015. The 59-year-old Phillips was home alone, and the Hopkins County coroner's investigation found no evidence of criminality in the event.

References

1956 births
2015 deaths
Accidental deaths from falls
Accidental deaths in Kentucky
American expatriate basketball people in Spain
Basketball players from Akron, Ohio
CB Murcia players
CB Valladolid players
Centers (basketball)
FC Barcelona Bàsquet players
Kentucky Wildcats men's basketball players
Liga ACB players
New Jersey Nets draft picks
RCD Espanyol Bàsquet players
American men's basketball players